The Golden Bell Award for Best Host in a Lifestyle Show is one of the categories of the competition for the Taiwanese television production, Golden Bell Awards. It has been awarded since 2017.

Award winners

2020s

References

Host in a Lifestyle Show, Best
Golden Bell Awards, Best Host in a Lifestyle Show